Gary Joseph Love (born 26 November 1964) is a British actor and film director. He is best known for playing the role of Sergeant Tony Wilton in the British Army inspired award-winning series Soldier Soldier, and as Jimmy McClaren in Grange Hill in 1984. He is also a director and has directed episodes of London's Burning, Casualty and Waking The Dead.

Love was born in Kensington, London, and attended the Barbara Speake Stage School in Acton, West London.

Filmography

As actor 
1984: Grange Hill as Jimmy McClaren
1986: Starting Out as Mick Brown (2 episodes)
1988  "A Question Of Style" (Austin Rover salesman training video)
1988: Jack the Ripper as Derek
Never the Twain as Postman
1989: Screen Two as Alan Loader (Here Is the News)
 Birds of a Feather as Pool Man (Just Visiting)
Blackeyes as Colin (2 episodes)
1990: The Krays as Teddy 'Steve' Smith
1991: Murder Most Horrid as Constable Williams ("The Case of the Missing")
The Bill as Mike Gibbs ("Thicker Than Water")
1993: You, Me and It as Gary
1991–1994: Soldier Soldier as Sgt Tony Wilton
1997: Loved by You as Lander
2000–01: Paranoid as Ned
2000: Essex Boys as Detective
2004: Fallen as DI Tom Beckett
2005: The Russian Dolls as Edward
Stoned as Jeff

As director 
1993: Come Snow, Come Blow (TV)
1996: Masculine Mescaline (short film)
1998: London's Burning (Episode 11.8)
1999: Harbour Lights (Baywatch, Muckraker)
1997–2000: Casualty (Out Of Control, Love Me Tender, Eye Spy, Love Over Gold Part 1 & 2, Seize the Night)
2001: Waking The Dead (Every Breath You Take Part 1 & 2)
2005: MIT (Episode 2.1, 2.2 & 2.4)
2007: Sugarhouse
2010: The Bill (Keep Her Talking, Suffer in Silence, Who Dares Wins, Death Knock)
2015: The Following (Exposed)

References

External links

Gary Love at Gary Love

1964 births
British male television actors
British television directors
Living people
People from Kensington
Male actors from London
20th-century British male actors
21st-century British male actors
British male film actors